The TCU Horned Frogs are the athletic teams that represent Texas Christian University. The 18 varsity teams participate in NCAA Division I and in the Football Bowl Subdivision (FBS) for football, competing mostly in the Big 12 Conference. The school was a founding member of the Southwest Conference and was a member of the Western Athletic Conference, Conference USA, and the Mountain West Conference before joining the Big 12. Two TCU teams participate outside the Big 12 in sports not sponsored by that conference. The rifle team competes in the Patriot Rifle Conference, and the beach volleyball team plays in the Coastal Collegiate Sports Association.

The "horned frog" nickname and mascot refer to the Texas horned lizard, also known as the "horned frog".

History
Texas Christian University began its athletic life as an independent program with a six-year (1914–1920) stint in the Texas Intercollegiate Athletic Association before eventually joining its longtime home, the Southwest Conference (SWC), in 1923.  TCU remained a member of the SWC until it disbanded after the 1995–96 academic year when the University of Texas, Texas A&M University, Texas Tech University and Baylor University defected from the conference to form the Big 12 Conference together with the members of the Big Eight Conference; the University of Arkansas had previously left for the Southeastern Conference in 1990, in the aftermath of the Southern Methodist University football scandal, leaving the SWC with no presence outside of the state of Texas. The Horned Frogs, without a conference to call home after 72 years, joined the Western Athletic Conference (WAC), along with SMU and Rice.  TCU called the WAC home from 1996 through 2000.  In 2001, TCU joined Conference USA (C-USA) and remained there through 2004.  TCU joined the Mountain West Conference (MWC) in 2005.  In 2010, TCU accepted an invitation to join the Big East Conference in all sports starting in 2012; however, on October 10, 2011, TCU announced that it had reversed its decision and would be joining the Big 12 (headquartered in another Metroplex city, Irving) in 2012 instead, a move that went into effect July 1.

Sponsored sports
Texas Christian University sponsors teams in nine men's and twelve women's NCAA sanctioned sports.

Football

The return of national prominence of TCU football began under the watch of Dennis Franchione when TCU defeated the Trojans of USC in the 1998 Sun Bowl. From 1939, the year after TCU's last national championship, to 1997, TCU's record was 314–383–24. In those 67 years, TCU won 6 Southwest Conference titles and attended 11 bowl games winning only one of those games. Since the 1998 season, TCU has won 7 conference titles, two in the Western Athletic Conference (1999 & 2000), one in Conference USA (2002), three in the Mountain West Conference (2005, 2009, and 2010) and the Big 12 Conference 2014 Co-Championship (with Baylor University). Since 1998, TCU has amassed a record of 79–30. In four of the last five years, the Horned Frogs have won at least 10 games in a season, and won 11 games in three of the last four. During this period TCU has won games against Louisville, Oklahoma, Texas Tech, Utah and BYU. From 1998 to 2006, TCU has attended 8 bowl games, winning five of them.  The record of TCU in bowl games as of 2006 is 9–13–1. TCU also claims two national championships from 1935 and 1938.

TCU has 41 1st team All-Americans, listed at TCU Horned Frogs football. The school's most famous past players include Rags Matthews, Sammy Baugh, Davey O'Brien (a Heisman Trophy winner, and namesake of the Davey O'Brien National Quarterback Award), Johnny Vaught (later one of the most celebrated coaches of the University of Mississippi), Ki Aldrich, Darrell Lester, Jim Swink, Sonny Gibbs, Norm Bulaich,  Bob Lilly, Kenneth Davis, 2006–07 NFL MVP LaDainian Tomlinson and two-time consensus All-American Jerry Gaither.  TCU have achieved success under numerous coaches including  Matty Bell, Dutch Meyer, Abe Martin, Dennis Franchione, and current coach Gary Patterson. Gary Patterson received nine National Coach of the Year honors in 2009. Coaches Matthews, Baugh, O'Brien, Aldrich, Lester, Swink, Lilly, and Dutch Meyer are all members of the College Football Hall of Fame. Baugh and Lilly are also members of the Pro Football Hall of Fame.

The TCU Football team plays its games in Amon G. Carter Stadium. The stadium opened in 1930 and has a capacity of 44,008. On December 5, 2010, the west wing of the Amon G. Carter Stadium was imploded in order accommodate 24 suites, including six Founder's suites on the lower level, and 2,300 club seats on the West side. Total cost of the renovation of Amon G. Carter Stadium is $105 million.

Baseball

TCU has fielded a baseball team since 1896, before the school found its home in Fort Worth, Texas. The Horned Frog baseball team began playing baseball in the Southwest Conference when it became a member of the conference in 1923.  That year they finished the year with a 13–11 overall record and a 2–10 conference record. In 1933 Dutch Meyer, also the coach of the football team, led TCU to its first SWC title with a 9–1 record. During the rest of their time in the SWC, the Frogs would win 6 more regular-season SWC baseball titles. Their next conference championship would come while members of Conference USA in 2004 and 2005. 2006 saw the Horned Frogs in a new conference, the Mountain West Conference. The Frogs went 17–5 in their first year in the MWC and never left first place. They also only had to play 3 games in the conference tournament to win the MWC Tournament Title to complement the regular season title.

TCU has made 14 appearances in the NCAA baseball tournament: 1956, 1994, 2004, 2005, 2006, 2007, 2008, 2009, 2010, 2011, 2012, 2014, 2015, and 2016. TCU has 23 All-Americans, six Freshman All-Americans, three players of the year awards, two pitchers of the year, and numerous All-Conference selections. The TCU Baseball Team makes its home in Lupton Stadium, with a capacity of 3,500.

Men's basketball

TCU has played since the 1908–1909 season.  That first year they entered the Waco City League and left with a record of 2–3, losing to the Baylor teams and defeating the Waco High teams.

The Horned Frogs played basketball in the Southwest Conference from the 1923–24 seasons until the breakup of the conference after the 1995–96 season.  During their time in the SWC they won 10 conference titles (1931, 1934, 1951*, 1952, 1953, 1959, 1968, 1971, 1986*, 1987; * denotes shared title). Buster Brannon owns the most wins as a coach in TCU Men's Basketball history with a career that spanned 20 years he earned a record of 205–259, a 104–144 record in SWC play, won 4 conference titles and earned three trips to the NCAA basketball tournament in 1952, 1953 and 1959.  The TCU Men's Basketball Team would only win one more conference championship after the breakup of the Southwest Conference. During the 1997–98 season under Coach Billy Tubbs, the team went 27–6 and 14–0 in WAC play. The team earned a trip to the Midwest Regional played in Oklahoma City, OK.  They would lose in the first round to Florida State.  TCU never won a title during their time in Conference USA or the Mountain West Conference.

TCU's other NCAA tournament appearances occurred in 1968, 1971 and 1987, 2017, and 2022.

Along with NCAA Tournament appearances, TCU appeared in the National Invitational Tournament six times – 1983, 1986, 1992, 1997, 1999 and 2005. They advanced to the quarterfinal round three times – 1983, 1999 and 2005, and they won the NIT championship in 2017.

The TCU Men's Basketball Team was coached from 2002 to 2007 by Neil Dougherty.  He was fired in March 2008, after TCU limped through yet another season with a losing record.  Jim Christian, previously with Kent State University, was hired shortly after Dougherty was fired.  Christian resigned on April 2, 2012, to accept the head coaching position at University of Ohio. He was replaced by Trent Johnson, who guided TCU into the Big 12. From 2012 to 2016, Johnson's teams posted a 50–79 record, including an 8–64 mark in Big 12 play, and never finished better than ninth in the ten-team league. Johnson was fired in 2016 and replaced by Jamie Dixon, a former TCU player who had served as head coach at Pittsburgh prior to returning to Fort Worth.

As of the end of the 2021–22 season, Dixon has led TCU to a 117–84 record, a 42–64 mark in Big 12 play, an NIT championship in 2017, and two appearances in the NCAA tournament. The 2021–22 season was the Frogs' best season yet, as they finished tied for fifth in the Big 12, reached the semifinals of the 2022 Big 12 men's basketball tournament, and won an NCAA tournament game for the first time since 1987.

The TCU Men's Basketball Team plays their home games in Schollmaier Arena, formerly known as the Daniel–Meyer Coliseum, on the campus of TCU.

Kurt Thomas, considered by some as the best athlete to attend TCU, played for the basketball team from 1990 to 1995.  He was a three time All-American and averaged 29 points and 15 rebounds his senior year.

Women's basketball

The Horned Frogs fielded their first women's basketball team in the 1977–78 season and recorded a 5–18 record. They improved significantly the following year, going 19–8. Current coach Raegan Pebley has been the coach of the team since the 2014–15 season.  During the 2000–01 season, the Horned Frogs won their first regular season and conference championship at the WAC Tournament. The program matched that accomplishment the next season, their first season in Conference USA during the 2001–2002 season.  They then proceeded to win the C-USA tournament in 2002–03 and 2004–05. Of the four years the Horned Frogs were in C-USA, they won the conference title four out of five years.

TCU has also reached the Women's NCAA tournament for six consecutive years, stretching back to the 2000–01 season. Each year, they have won their first game of the tournament and lost the second game, except for first-round losses to Oregon in 2005 and to South Dakota State in 2009. TCU women's basketball has reached the post season 11 out of 12 years that Coach Jeff Mittie has been head of the program.

The Horned Frogs share Schollmaier Arena with the men's team, playing under the roof there for the entire history of the program.

Until the 2010–11 athletics' season, the women's athletic teams went by "Lady Frogs".

Women's volleyball
The TCU Women's Volleyball Team is coached by Prentice Lewis with the help of associate head coach Jason Tanaka who both joined the team in February 2002. Since Lewis' arrival, the volleyball team has had the third best record to date at 12–18. The next year, 2003, the Horned Frogs recorded their best record to date at 20–11 and made it to the second round of the C-USA tournament, a first for a TCU Volleyball team.  2005 the Horned Frog Volleyball team saw their first year in the Mountain West Conference.  The team finished the season 16–18 and were seeded 8th in the conference tournament.  They defeated the number 9 seed, Air Force, in the play-in match 3–1.  The Frogs then fell to the top seeded BYU 3–0 in the quarterfinals round.  2006 the Frogs recorded a 17–15 record and were the sixth seed in the MWC tournament.  They eventually lost to Colorado State University 3–1.  The 2006 season marked the Horned Frogs third winning season in four years.

The Women's Volleyball Team plays their home games in the Ed & Rae Shollmaier Arena on the TCU campus.

Men's and Women's cross country
The Men's and Women's TCU Harriers Cross Country teams compete in the Big 12 Conference.  For purposes of qualifying for the NCAA Men's and Women's Cross Country Championships, the TCU Harriers compete in the South Central Regional while the rest of the conference competes in the Rocky Mountain Regional. From 2003 to 2005 the TCU Harriers sent a runner to the NCAA Men's or Women's Cross Country Championships. The TCU Harriers Cross Country team is coached by Eric Heins.

Women's equestrian
In December 2005 it was announced that starting in the 2006–2007 academic year women's equestrian would become a varsity sport sponsored by TCU.  The NCAA designated equestrian as an emerging sport in 1998, and, in 2013, there were 37 intercollegiate programs recognized for NCAA competition. Programs in the region include Baylor, Kansas State, Oklahoma State, SMU, Stephen F. Austin, Texas A&M, and West Texas A&M. Intercollegiate equestrian programs support an average of 70 student-athletes.

Golf

Men's golf
The TCU Men's Golf team is led by 20-year Head Coach Bill Montigel.  During his tenure, Coach Montigel has guided the men's golf team to five consecutive conference titles from 2001 to 2005 between the Horned Frogs time in the WAC and MWC. Since 1990, the Horned Frogs have qualified as a team to the NCAA South Central Regional every year. In ten of those years, the team moved on to the NCAA Championships. Among the most notable TCU men's golf alumni are J. J. Henry and Tom Hoge who was a member of the United States team during the 2006 Ryder Cup. The TCU golf team practices at the Colonial Golf & Country Club. They have won nine conference titles: SWC (1986), WAC (1997, 1998, 2001) C-USA (2002, 2003, 2004, 2005), and MWC (2009).

Women's golf
In 1983, the TCU Women's Golf team accounted for the school's lone national championship outside of football.  Currently the women's golf team is led by Head Coach Angie Ravaioli-Larkin. The Horned Frogs have at least four former players now playing professionally. The most notable is multiple LPGA Tour-winner Angela Stanford.  TCU practices at the Colonial Country Club.

Women's Rifle
The Women's Rifle team has had a number of firsts in the history of TCU athletics. In 1972, Sue Ann Sandusky was recorded as Texas Christian University's first All-American.  Also, In 2010, the team became the first all-female squad to win a national championship. The TCU Women's Rifle team is currently led by head coach Karen Monez, who has been a part of the program since 2003.

In June 2013, the Horned Frogs became a charter member of the Patriot Rifle Conference.

All-Americans

Women's soccer
In 1986, the TCU Women's Soccer team played its first season in Fort Worth, Texas. Since their emergence in 1986 the Women's Soccer Team has achieved an all-time record of 194–233–29. As yet, they have no NCAA appearances and no conference championships. They are a part of the Mountain West Conference.

Being only the second head coach of the Horned Frogs since its start is Dan Abdalla, who has now coached the team for 6 seasons. His record at TCU (as of the beginning of his 6th season) is 43–44–6. He led the TCU soccer women's program to the Mountain West Conference Tournament in 2007 for the first time in the program's history. Prior to coaching the Horned Frogs, Dan Abdalla was the head coach at UNLV (University of Nevada Las Vegas) for 5 seasons. Before taking over the head coach position at UNLV, Abdalla was the assistant coach at the University for 1 season. UNLV was also his alma mater from 1994 to 1997.

The assistant coach is Kerri Hanks, who started coaching at TCU in 2010. She graduated from Notre Dame, where she received the Hermann Trophy award two times, awarded to the top female college soccer player of the year.  She helped the Fighting Irish advance to the NCAA National Championship match during the 2006 and 2008 seasons.

In 2007, the TCU Women's Soccer team received an award for being one of the best academic sports teams in the nation. For the second-consecutive year the womenʼs soccer program was recognized by the National Soccer Coaches Association of America with the NSCAA Team Academic Award. The Horned Frogs also placed 14 individuals on the Fall Academic All-Mountain West Conference Team.

The women's soccer team plays their home matches at Garvey-Rosenthal Stadium, which seats 1,500.  The Horned Frogs reached a season high of 2,300 attendees at the game against The University of Southern California in the 2010 fall season.

In August 2010, the Jane Justin Field House was added to the complex. The Jane Justin Field House contains a locker room for the TCU women's soccer team, its visitors, and officials. There are also coaches' meeting rooms and an athletic training room. The field house was named honoring Jane C. Justine, who graduated from TCU in 1943. The facility's field house was a $1.5 million gift from the John and Jane Justin Foundation. This is the largest gift solely provided for woman's athletics at Texas Christian University to date.

All-Conference Players

Men's & women's swimming and diving
Recently taken over by Head Coach James Winchester in April 2018, the Texas Christian University swimming and diving program officially formed in 1979. Richard Sybesma was the first head coach for TCU swimming and diving and remained so for thirty-eight years. Although there was an actual swim team before 1979, but the team did not keep records, therefore we know little about the team.

The TCU swimming and diving program has won over 400 dual meets including championship meets. The TCU swimming and diving team has been in three different conferences since its beginning. First was the Southwest conference from 1979 to 1993, then moved to the Western Atlantic Conference (WAC) in 1994–2000, in 2001 they proceeded to Conference USA, and finally from 2005–present the TCU swim team has been in the Mountain West Conference (MWC).

While in the Conference USA conference the men's swimming and diving team dominated the pools across the country. They were the Conference USA champions in 2002, 2003, 2004, and 2005. The women's team also had much success in the Conference USA. In 2002 and 2004 TCU swimming and diving swept Conference USA by winning both on the men and women's side. The TCU swimming and diving team had yet to achieve such awards until 2010 when the men's team won the Mountain West Conference dual meet Championship.

The Texas Christian University Swimming and Diving program are not only an athletic team, but they also have a great record for academics, The College Coaches Association has honored the TCU women's program as an Academic All-American swim team for over thirty-five consecutive semesters while the men's program has been honored on over thirteen occasions. This program along with all the athletic programs at Texas Christian University have been in many different conferences including, the Western Atlantic Conference, Conference USA, Mountain West Conference, and starting in 2012 the Horned Frogs joined the Big 12 Conference.

All home meets are located in the Student Recreation Center on the campus of TCU.

Men and women swimming All-Americans

The TCU Horned Frog Swimming and Diving have produced fourteen All-Americans within the AIAW and NCAA. Between these swimmers are twelve women and two men.

Men's & women's track and field

Indoor track
Individual championships

Outdoor championships
Individual champions

**collegiate record; NCAA meet record

Tennis
The TCU Tennis teams play their home matches at the Bayard H. Friedman Tennis Center, rated the #1 facility in the nation by Tennis Magazine.

Men's tennis

The TCU Men's Tennis team was coached by Dave Borelli. Before he became coach of the men's team, Borelli coached the TCU Women's Tennis team four years before.  They are the 2005–2006 Mountain West Conference Tournament Champions.
Currently, the horned frogs are coached by David Roditi. TCU men's tennis is currently ranked #3 in the country.

Women's tennis
The TCU Women's Tennis team was coached by Jefferson Hammond.  They are the 2005–2006 Mountain West Conference regular season and tournament champions. Lee Walker is the current head coach of TCU Women's tennis who are ranked #22 for this upcoming season.

Notable non-varsity sports

Rugby
The Texas Christian University Rugby Football Club plays in Division 1 of college rugby in the Southwest conference against other in-state rivals. TCU rugby plays its home games at the TCU Rugby Pitch, located at 3400 W. Berry St. TCU rugby has been led since 2008 by head coach Ben Cole, a USA Rugby certified coach.

Traditions

Horned Frog Mascot

The Horned Frog first appeared in 1897 on the cover of the first AddRan yearbook.  By 1915, the mascot made its way onto the first TCU seal.  During the post-WWII years, the Horned Frog Mascot was embraced in costume, on stationery, class rings and the band's bass drums.  In 1979 the mascot was renamed from Addy the All-American Frog to Super Frog.

TCU has capitalized on its mascot by marketing a bumper sticker (in a role reversal of where a frog, once kissed, turns into a prince) stating "My Princess Turned into a Frog".

Team Colors
TCU's official colors are purple and white.  Since the 1990s, the Horned Frogs have gradually incorporated black as a color and it now features prominently as a tertiary color with most uniforms having black trim and TCU teams occasionally wearing black alternate uniforms.  The Horned Frogs will also occasionally wear red as an accent color, a reference to horned lizards shooting blood from their eye sockets as a defense mechanism.

Music

Fight song
The TCU fight song "TCU March" was written for the marching band by Claude Sammis in 1928.

Cheers
TCU's most notable cheer is Riff Ram Bah Zoo.

Championships

NCAA team championships
TCU has won 4 NCAA team national championships.

 Women's (1)
 Golf (1): 1983
 Co-ed (3)
 Rifle (3): 2010, 2012, 2019
 see also:
Big 12 Conference national team titles
 List of NCAA schools with the most NCAA Division I championships

Other national team championships
Below are 3 national team titles claimed by the athletic department that were not bestowed by the NCAA:
 Men's:
 Football (2): 1935, 1938
 Women's:
 Equestrian (1): 2008
 see also:
 List of NCAA schools with the most Division I national championships

Championships coaches

1 – Named Co-National Champion by the Williamson System along with LSU. SMU was named National Champion by the Dickinson System which was favored at the time. Princeton and Minnesota also claim a national championship from this season by other poll systems active at the time.

2 – Although the NCAA Rifle Sport is coed, the TCU Rifle National Championship Team was made up of only females, marking the first time an all-women team has won the national title.

References

External links